James Henry Freeman (21 November 1889 – 4 February 1956) was an Australian rules footballer who played with Essendon in the Victorian Football League (VFL).

Notes

External links 

		
Jim Freeman's playing statistics from The VFA Project

1889 births
1956 deaths
Australian rules footballers from Victoria (Australia)
Essendon Football Club players
North Melbourne Football Club (VFA) players